Coast to Coast: Overture and Beginners is a 1974 live album credited to Rod Stewart/Faces. Stewart's practice was not giving concerts as a solo act at the time, but rather appearing jointly with the Faces, thus the dual crediting.

History 
The album presents only three numbers from the previous albums by the Faces, while presenting six from Stewart's solo releases. The two tracks that had not seen the light of day on either were renditions of "I Wish It Would Rain," first made famous by The Temptations, and "Jealous Guy," from John Lennon.

The performance was recorded with replacement Faces bassist Tetsu Yamauchi, filling in for departed member Ronnie Lane. Lane had left soon after the release of Ooh La La, fed up at the group increasingly being presented as Stewart's backing band.  Coast to Coast was recorded live on 17 October 1973 at the Anaheim Convention Center and was mixed at Island Studios in London.

In an unusual arrangement, LP versions of the album were issued in the United States by Mercury Records (which at the time issued Stewart's solo albums), while cassette and 8-track configurations were issued by Warner Bros. Records, the Faces' erstwhile label—and with whom Stewart would sign as a solo artist following the Faces' demise.

The back cover photo is actually the Old Boston Garden taken on May 2, 1973.

Long out of print in the United States, Coast to Coast is only available as an import from Japan. The Faces would disband within a year and a half of the album's release.

Track listing 

Side one
 "It's All Over Now" (Bobby Womack, Shirley Womack) - 4:38
 "Cut Across Shorty" (Wayne Walker, Marijohn Wilkin) - 3:45
 "Too Bad" (R. Stewart-R. Wood) / "Every Picture Tells A Story" (Rod Stewart, Ronnie Wood) - 7:34
 "Angel" (Jimi Hendrix) - 4:28
 "Stay With Me" (Stewart, Wood) - 4:50

Side two
 "I Wish It Would Rain" (Roger Penzabene, Barrett Strong, Norman Whitfield) - 4:20
 "I'd Rather Go Blind" (Billy Foster, Ellington Jordan) - 5:55
 "Borstal Boys" (Ian McLagan, Stewart, Wood) / "Amazing Grace" (Traditional, arr. D. Throat) - 9:52
 "Jealous Guy" (John Lennon) - 4:25

Charts

Personnel 
 Rod Stewart - lead vocals
 Ronnie Wood - guitars, backing vocals
 Ian McLagan - keyboards, backing vocals
 Tetsu Yamauchi - bass, trombone
 Kenney Jones - drums

Production 
 Faces – producer
 Gary Kellgren - engineer
 Tom Scott and Tom Fly - assistant engineers

References 

Faces (band) albums
Rod Stewart live albums
1974 live albums
Mercury Records live albums
Warner Records live albums